The 2017–18 Al-Taawoun season is the club's 62nd season in existence and its 10th (non-consecutive) season in the top tier of Saudi Arabian football. This season, Al-Taawoun is participating in the Pro League for the eighth consecutive season as well as the King Cup and Crown Prince Cup. The season covers the period from 1 July 2017 to 30 June 2018.

Pre-season friendlies

Players

First team squad
This section lists players who were in Al-Taawoun's first team squad at any point during the 2017–18 season
Asterisks indicates player left mid-season
Hash symbol indicates player retired mid-season
Italics indicate loan player

Transfers

Transfers in

Transfers out

Loans in

Loans out

Competitions

Overall

Pro League

League table

Results summary

Results by round

Matches
All times are local, AST (UTC+3).

Crown Prince Cup

All times are local, AST (UTC+3).

King Cup
Al-Taawoun will enter the King Cup in the Round of 32 alongside the other Pro League teams.

Statistics

Squad statistics
As of 25 November 2017.

|}

Goalscorers

Last Updated: 25 November 2017

Clean sheets

Last Updated: 20 October 2017

References

Al-Taawoun FC seasons
Taawoun